Vitali Yuryevich Kravtsov (born 23 December 1999) is a Russian professional ice hockey winger for the Vancouver Canucks of the National Hockey League (NHL). He was drafted ninth overall by the New York Rangers in the 2018 NHL Entry Draft.

Playing career
Kravtsov made his KHL debut during the 2016–17 season. During the 2018 KHL playoffs, Kravtsov tied the KHL record for most points by an 18-year-old in the postseason, and later broke it on 21 March 2018.

On 22 June 2018, Kravtsov was drafted ninth overall by the New York Rangers in the 2018 NHL Entry Draft. He was signed by the Rangers to a three-year, entry-level contract on 3 May 2019.

After attending the Rangers 2019 training camp, Kravtsov was assigned to make his North American debut with AHL affiliate, the Hartford Wolf Pack, to start the 2019–20 season. Registering 1 assist in 5 games, Kravtsov opted to continue his development back in Russia, securing a loan for the remainder of the season with former club, Traktor Chelyabinsk of the KHL, on 28 October 2019. Kravtsov appeared in 11 games in his return to Chelyabinsk, recording 3 points, before his loan was ended prematurely by the Rangers and he was re-assigned to re-join the Wolf Pack on 13 December 2019.

On 30 August 2020, Kravtsov signed a one-year extension with Traktor Chelyabinsk. Kravtsov made his NHL debut in the Rangers' 3–2 shootout loss to the Buffalo Sabres on 3 April 2021.  He scored his first NHL goal against the New Jersey Devils on 18 April 2021.

On 12 October 2021, after not making the Rangers' 2021–22 opening night roster, and being sent down to the Hartford Wolf Pack, Kravtsov refused to report to Hartford and was given permission to contact other teams to facilitate a trade. On 3 November, Kravtsov was loaned to Traktor Chelyabinsk. On 13 June 2022, he signed a one-year contract extension with the Rangers.

Having rejected a contract extension to remain with Traktor, Kravtsov opted to return to the Rangers and signed a one-year, $875,000 contract for the  season on 12 June 2022.

On 25 February 2023, Kravtsov was traded from the Rangers to the Vancouver Canucks in exchange for Will Lockwood and a seventh round draft pick in 2026.

International play

 

 

Kravtsov represented the Russian national junior team at the 2019 World Junior Championships in Vancouver, Canada. He ended the tournament with 6 points in 7 games, helping Russia claim the bronze medal against Swiss national junior team on 6 January 2019.

Career statistics

Regular season and playoffs

International

References

External links
 

1999 births
Living people
Chelmet Chelyabinsk players
Hartford Wolf Pack players
National Hockey League first-round draft picks
New York Rangers draft picks
New York Rangers players
Russian ice hockey right wingers
Sportspeople from Vladivostok
Traktor Chelyabinsk players
Vancouver Canucks players